Diego Mirko Haro Sueldo (born 18 December 1982) is a Peruvian football referee who has been a full international referee for FIFA since 2013.

He was in the 2017 FIFA U-20 World Cup. Haro notably handed out seven yellow cards in the first half of a group stage match between the United States and Saudi Arabia.

References

1982 births
Living people
Peruvian football referees
Copa América referees